Luis Gustavo Sánchez Saucedo (born 3 May 2000) is a Mexican professional footballer who plays as a centre-back for Liga MX club Monterrey.

Career statistics

Club

Honours
Monterrey
CONCACAF Champions League: 2021

References

External links
 
 
 

Living people
2000 births
Mexican footballers
Association football defenders
C.F. Monterrey players
Liga de Expansión MX players
Liga MX players
Footballers from Veracruz
People from Tantoyuca
Raya2 Expansión players